The electoral history of Tishaura Jones spans more than a decade. A member of the Democratic Party, Jones was first elected to the Missouri House of Representatives in 2008. In 2012, she was elected as Treasurer of St. Louis, a position she has since held through various elections and primaries. Jones ran for Mayor of St. Louis in 2017, but came in second to Lyda Krewson in the Democratic primary; Krewson would later win the general election and become the city's first female mayor. In 2020, following her election to a third term as treasurer, Jones announced she would once again run for mayor in the 2021 election, which was the city's first to use approval voting. Jones won that election over St. Louis Alderwoman Cara Spencer and will be the 47th Mayor of St. Louis.

Missouri House of Representatives

2008

2010

St. Louis Treasurer

2012

2016

2020

Democratic Party committee

2016

St. Louis Mayor

2017

2021

References

Jones